Renée Jeryd (born 1965) is a Swedish social democratic politician. She has been a member of the Riksdag since 2008.

External links
Renée Jeryd at the Riksdag website

Members of the Riksdag from the Social Democrats
Living people
1965 births
Women members of the Riksdag
21st-century Swedish women politicians
Date of birth missing (living people)
Place of birth missing (living people)